Prime Minister Clark may refer to:
 Helen Clark (born 1950), Prime Minister of New Zealand from 1999 to 2008
 Joe Clark (born 1939), Prime Minister of Canada from 1979 to 1980